Emmanuel Duchemin (born 14 March 1979 in Amiens, France) is a French former professional footballer who played defensive midfielder.

Career
Duchemin joined his first club, Aimens SC, in 1997.

He remained there until 2003 before leaving for Tomblaine based club AS Nancy-Lorraine. 

Duchemin was forced to retire due to injury problems in 2008.

References

External links
 

1979 births
Living people
Sportspeople from Amiens
French footballers
Association football midfielders
Amiens SC players
AS Nancy Lorraine players
Footballers from Hauts-de-France